Jacobus Venter (born 13 February 1987) is a South African racing cyclist, who currently rides for amateur mountain biking team First Move.

During his road racing career, Venter rode in the 2014 Vuelta a España. In 2016, he won the South African National Road Race Championships. He was named in the start list for the 2016 Giro d'Italia. In June 2017, he was named in the startlist for the 2017 Tour de France.

Major results

2005
 2nd Road race, National Junior Road Championships
 5th Overall Tour de Lorraine
2007
 1st Powerade Dome 2 Dome Cycling Spectacular
2008
 9th Overall Coupe des nations Ville Saguenay
2009
 1st  Time trial, National Under-23 Road Championships
 4th Overall Tour de l'Avenir
 5th Overall Grand Prix du Portugal
 10th Overall Tour de Korea
2010
 3rd Time trial, National Road Championships
 10th Overall La Tropicale Amissa Bongo
2011
 2nd  Team time trial, African Road Championships
2012
 5th Time trial, African Road Championships
 6th Duo Normand (with Reinardt Janse van Rensburg)
 8th Gooikse Pijl
2014
 3rd Time trial, National Road Championships
2016
 1st  Road race, National Road Championships

Grand Tour general classification results timeline

References

External links

1987 births
Living people
South African male cyclists
People from Stellenbosch
White South African people
Sportspeople from the Western Cape